A yell is a loud vocalization; see screaming.

Yell may also refer to:

Places

United Kingdom
 Yell, Shetland, one of the North Isles of the Shetland archipelago, Scotland
 Yell Sound, Shetland, Scotland

United States
 Yell, Tennessee, an unincorporated community
 Yell County, Arkansas, territorial subdivision
 Yell Township, Boone County, Iowa

Other
 Yell!, British pop duo (1989–1991)
 Yell (company), based in Britain
 Archibald Yell (1797–1847), United States general and congressman from Arkansas
 Yell (TV series), aired on NHK TV from March to September 2020.

See also
Yelling (disambiguation)